Twice Second is an album by German heavy metal band Symphorce, released in 2005.

Track listing
All songs written & arranged by Franck, Dupont, Wohlbold and Pohl

 "Fallen" - 5:54
 "Tears" - 4:40
 "Whatever Hate Provides" - 4:32
 "Cause of Laughter" - 5:02
 "In the Cold" - 3:44
 "Take What's Mine" - 5:34
 "Face of Pain" - 4:22
 "Searching" - 4:26
 "Two Seconds to Live" - 3:56
 "Cry on My Shoulder" - 6:16
 "Under the Curse"* - 5:08

The European edition contains this song as a bonus track*

Personnel
Andy B. Franck    -   Vocals
Cedric Dupont     -   Guitars
Markus Pohl       -   Guitars
Dennis Wohlbold   -   Bass
Sascha Sauer      -   Drums

2005 albums
Symphorce albums
Metal Blade Records albums
Albums with cover art by Travis Smith (artist)